Gloomy the Naughty Grizzly (Japanese: いたずらぐまのグル～ミ～, Hepburn: Itazuraguma no Gloomy) is a Japanese anime television series produced by NAZ. The series aired from April to June 2021 in Japan, and was streamed worldwide via YouTube, Twitter, and Instagram.

Synopsis
Gloomy was abandoned as a cub and rescued by his current owner, Pity. Pity once had a teddy bear that was thrown away by his mother, so he promised himself that he would never abandon Gloomy. Gloomy, being a wild animal, constantly attacks Pity.

Characters

Production and release
Gloomy the Naughty Grizzly was announced on December 28, 2020. Produced by NAZ, the series was directed by Takehiro Kubota and written by Mori Chack. The series aired from April 12 to June 28, 2021 on Tokyo MX. Crunchyroll licensed the series outside of Asia. Medialink also licensed the series across Asia-Pacific. It also streamed worldwide on their YouTube channel, Twitter and Instagram accounts.

Episodes

References

External links
 Official website 
 

Animated television series about bears
Crunchyroll anime
Medialink
Naz (studio)
Tokyo MX original programming